Speckled Trout Creek is a creek in geographic Labonte Township, Algoma District in Northeastern Ontario, Canada. It is almost entirely in Lake Superior Provincial Park, is in the Great Lakes Basin, and empties into Lake Superior.

Speckled Trout Creek begins at Speckled Trout Lake and heads west under the Algoma Central Railway, to the east of the dispersed rural community of Frater, and enters Lake Superior Provincial Park. It turns southwest, then west, passes under Ontario Highway 17 and reaches Lake Superior.

See also
List of rivers of Ontario

References

Tributaries of Lake Superior
Rivers of Algoma District